Artsem Kozyr (born 10 May 1990) is a Belarusian sprint canoeist. He participated at the 2018 ICF Canoe Sprint World Championships.

References

External links

1990 births
Belarusian male canoeists
Living people
ICF Canoe Sprint World Championships medalists in Canadian
Canoeists at the 2019 European Games
European Games medalists in canoeing
European Games gold medalists for Belarus
Sportspeople from Minsk
Universiade medalists in canoeing
Universiade bronze medalists for Belarus
Medalists at the 2013 Summer Universiade